The Hilton House is an historic house in White Lake, South Dakota. 

It is built in the Queen Anne architectural style. It was built ca. 1920, and added to the National Register of Historic Places in 2000.  As of 2017, it was operated as the Geyer Guesthouse.

References

Houses on the National Register of Historic Places in South Dakota
Queen Anne architecture in South Dakota
Houses in Aurora County, South Dakota
National Register of Historic Places in Aurora County, South Dakota